The Taizi Great Mosque (Xiao'erjing: تَيْ‌زِ ٿٍْ‌جٍ دَاسِْ) is a mosque in Yinchuan, Ningxia Hui Autonomous Region, China.

History
The mosque underwent four renovations over the past four years.

See also
 Weizhou Grand Mosque
 Tongxin Great Mosque
 Islam in China
 List of mosques in China

References

Buildings and structures in Yinchuan
Mosques in China